Sohodolls is an English electronic music band from London. The group was formed in 2003 and, following various line-up changes, consists of Maya von Doll (vocals), Toni Sailor (guitar), Weston Doll (Steven Weston) (keyboards), Matt Lord (double bass) and Paul Stone (drums).

The band—whose name is sometimes punctuated with a space as Soho Dolls—have described their sound as a cross between "decaying and desperate glamour" and "savagery and sex". Their debut album Ribbed Music for the Numb Generation was released through A&G Records in September 2007.

Biography
Sohodolls were formed in 2003 as an all-female band signed to A&G Records, with their first line-up consisting of Sammi Doll (Sammie Rayson), Maya Von Doll (Maya von der Louw) and Pato (Pato Munich). Their debut single "Stripper" would be released in 2004, and was the only release with Sammi as vocals, as she would leave the group soon after.

In 2004, Maya von Doll recruited guitarists Toni Sailor (Sailor Doll) and Gavin Jay after they attended a performance at the Rhythm Factory in London, setting the layer of the second line-up.

In mid-2006, soon after releasing their second single "Pleasures of Soho", both Gavin Jay and Sammi Doll decided to part ways with the Sohodolls. Wanting to explore more additions to the group in instruments, Maya and Toni found Steven Weston (Weston Doll) who took over the role on keyboards/synths. They then hired Paul Stone and Matt Lord to play drums and double bass, giving the group its third and current line-up.

The band's first two singles, released on Poptones, Alan McGee's record label, caused enough of a stir to reach numbers seven and twelve on the UK Indie Chart. These were followed by another release of "Stripper", "No Regrets" and then "Right and Right Again", which won acclaim from The Fly to Clash and NME. They began writing and recording their debut album in 2006 with producers Robert Harder (Babyshambles, The Sunshine Underground) and Steve Lyon (The Clash, Depeche Mode). In October 2006, the band released a download-only single, "No Regrets". Throughout 2006, Sohodolls attracted more attention, touring with She Wants Revenge during July, performing at Playboy Russias annual Playmate of the Year party in Moscow in August, The Big Issue'''s 15th-anniversary concert in September, and two UK tours as well as international dates in Los Angeles, Germany, France, Italy, Spain, Belgium and Istanbul.

Their debut album, Ribbed Music for the Numb Generation, was released in September 2007, preceded by the single download-only single "My Vampire" and fully released single "Right and Right Again". The album also contains five of the group's previous singles, including the two album-release singles & five newly recorded tracks made specifically for the album. it was also supported by an extensive 35-date headline tour of the UK.

Their 2006 single "Stripper" was used in the American television series Gossip Girl when one of the main characters, Blair Waldorf (Leighton Meester) stripped to it in episode "Victor, Victrola", which aired on 7 November 2007 on The CW. The band was again featured in Gossip Girl when their song, "I'm Not Cool", played during the episode "In the Realm of the Basses" when Blair confronts Chuck in the Victrola club.

Their music also appeared in the 2011 video game Test Drive Unlimited 2, with the Allister Whitehead club remix of "Right and Right Again" rotating on the Hariba Radio in-game radio station and "Bang Bang Bang Bang" playing both on the RoadRock in-game radio station and also during the carwash scene.

Von Doll's solo song "Play My Way" was featured in the third episode of the fifth season of Gossip Girl, titled "The Jewel of Denial" and originally aired 10 October 2011. On the same day, the track was released digitally by Quid Records.

On 28 February 2014, the band released a new EP, titled Mayday, containing 3 new songs.

In 2014, Maya von Doll started a new band called New Pharaohs.

During late 2020, their songs "Bang Bang Bang Bang" and "Stripper" became popular songs on TikTok. Due to their newfound popularity Sohodolls released remasters for both songs, "Stripper" on 22 October 2020 and "Bang Bang Bang Bang" on 18 February 2021.

After the release of the "Stripper" and "Bang Bang Bang Bang" remasters, Sohodolls released charity single "Period" on 4 March 2021, in partnership with Period Poverty to raise money to provide feminine products to girls and women in refugee camps or in otherwise deprived areas.

On 30 April, Sohodolls released their song "Shut Your Pretty Mouth" on streaming services after the song's demo had leaked on YouTube, however, the song was not completely new, as it had been played in clubs in London sometime in 2009.

On 28 October 2022, the band released their song "Bad."

Tour
As well as having toured the UK seven times the band have also played in Japan, Korea (International Rock Festival at Pusan Beach), Moscow, Los Angeles, Istanbul, Rome, Berlin, Paris, Barcelona, Vienna, Brussels, Hamburg, Madrid, Piza, Cologne, Oslo, Munich, Weinheim, Frankfurt, Freiburg and have toured widely in the UK, often playing towns off the beaten circuit.  They have also toured with/supported IAMX, Ladytron, Klaxons, Daft Punk, Vive la Fête, She Wants Revenge, The Magic Numbers, Hanoi Rocks, Apoptygma Berzerk, and Marilyn Manson.

To promote the release of their debut album Ribbed Music for the Numb Generation, Sohodolls embarked on their biggest tour to date. Starting at Hoxton Bar & Grill, London, on 4 September 2007, they headlined 34 venues across the UK.

Discography
Albums
 Ribbed Music for the Numb Generation (2007)

Extended plays
 Prince Harry EP (2005)
 Mayday EP'' (2014)

Singles

Maya von Doll's solo singles
 "Play My Way" (2011)
 "Open Checkbook" (2012)
 "Is This Love" (featuring Robs & Duke) (2012)

References

2003 establishments in England
English electronic rock musical groups
English alternative rock groups
English synth-pop groups
English glam rock groups
Musical groups established in 2003
Musical groups from London
Electropunk musical groups